Suavocallia is a genus of land snails with an operculum, terrestrial gastropod mollusks in the family Pupinidae.

Species
Species within the genus Suavocallia include:
 Suavocallia splendens

References

 
Pupinidae
Taxonomy articles created by Polbot